The women's 3000 metres at the 2007 Asian Winter Games was held on 29 January 2007 in Changchun, China.

Schedule
All times are China Standard Time (UTC+08:00)

Records

Results

References
Results
Results

External links
Official website

Women 3000